Frigoribacterium is a Gram-positive, non-spore-forming and motile genus of bacteria from the family of Microbacteriaceae.

References

Further reading 
 
 

Microbacteriaceae
Bacteria genera